The American Osteopathic Board of Dermatology (AOBD) is an organization that provides board certification to qualified Doctors of Osteopathic Medicine (D.O.) who specialize in the medical and surgical treatment of disorders of the skin (dermatologists). The board is one of 18 medical specialty certifying boards of the American Osteopathic Association Bureau of Osteopathic Specialists approved by the American Osteopathic Association (AOA). It was established in 1945. The AOBD is one of two certifying boards for dermatologists in the United States. The other certifying authority is the American Board of Dermatology, a member board of the American Board of Medical Specialties. As of 2011, 396 osteopathic physicians held active certification with the AOBD. In addition to the fellows of the American Board of Dermatology, board certified osteopathic dermatologists are eligible for admission into the American Society for Mohs Surgery.

Board certification
Initial certification is available to osteopathic dermatologists who have successfully completed an AOA-approved residency in dermatology, two years of practice, successful completion of clinical and written exams. Diplomates of the American Osteopathic Board of Dermatology requires osteopathic dermatologists to renew their certification every ten years to avoid expiration of their board certified status.

Subspecialties
The AOBD also oversees examinations for osteopathic dermatologists that seek to subspecialize in the fields of Mohs micrographic surgery and dermatopathology.

See also
Dermatology
American Board of Dermatology
American Osteopathic Association Bureau of Osteopathic Specialists

References

External links
AOBD Official Website
Skinly Aesthetics Medical Spa
PMA Medical Aesthetic Clinics

Dermatology organizations
Osteopathic medical associations in the United States
Organizations established in 1945
1945 establishments in the United States
Medical and health organizations based in Missouri